Phipps may refer to:

Phipps (surname)
Phipps, Wisconsin, an unincorporated community
Phipps Bridge tram stop, a halt on the Tramlink service in the London Borough of Merton
Phipps Conservatory and Botanical Gardens, buildings and grounds set in Schenley Park, Pittsburgh, Pennsylvania
Phipps NBC, a brewing company based in Northampton, England
Phipps Plaza, a mall in Buckhead, Atlanta